The following elections occurred in the year 2005.

 2005 United Nations Security Council election

Africa
 2005 Burkinabé presidential election
 2005 Burundian Senate election
 2005 Burundian communal elections
 2005 Burundian constitutional referendum
 2005 Burundian legislative election
 2005 Burundian presidential election
 2005 Central African Republic general election
 2005 Chadian constitutional referendum
 2005 Democratic Republic of the Congo constitutional referendum
 2005 Djiboutian presidential election
 2005 Egyptian parliamentary election
 2005 Egyptian constitutional referendum
 2005 Egyptian presidential election
 2005 Ethiopian general election
 2005 Gabonese presidential election
 2005 Guinea-Bissau presidential election
 2005 Kenyan constitutional referendum
 2005 Liberian general election
 2005 Mauritian general election
 2005 Results of the Zimbabwean parliamentary election
 2005 Somaliland parliamentary election
 2005 Tanzanian general election
 2005 Togolese presidential election
 2005 Zimbabwean Senate election
 2005 Zimbabwean parliamentary election

Asia
 2005 Azerbaijani parliamentary election
 2005 Afghan parliamentary election
 2005 Hong Kong Chief Executive election
 2005 Iranian presidential election
 2005 Kazakhstani presidential election
 2005 Kuomintang chairmanship election
 2005 Kyrgyzstani presidential election
 2005 Kyrgyzstani parliamentary election
 2005 Lebanese general election
 2005 Maldivian parliamentary election
 2005 Macanese legislative election
 2005 Mongolian presidential election
 2005 Nagorno-Karabakh parliamentary election
 2005 Palestinian local elections
 2005 Palestinian presidential election
 2005 Republic of China National Assembly election
 2005 Results of the Japanese general election
 2005 Saudi Arabian municipal elections
 2005 Singaporean presidential election
 2005 Sri Lankan presidential election
 2005 Republic of China local elections
 2005 Tajikistani parliamentary election
 2005 Thai general election
 2004–2005 Uzbekistani parliamentary election

India
 Bihar Assembly Election, Feb 2005
 Bihar Assembly Election, Oct 2005
 2005 Kollam Municipal Corporation election
 State Assembly elections in India, 2005

Iraq
 2005 Al-Anbar governorate council election
 2005 Babil governorate council election
 2005 Kurdistan Region governorate elections
 2005 Kurdistan Region independence referendum
 2005 Iraqi governorate elections
 December 2005 Iraqi parliamentary election
 January 2005 Iraqi parliamentary election
 2005 Ninawa governorate council election

Japan
 2005 Hino mayoral election
 2005 Ibaraki gubernatorial election
 2005 Japanese general election
 2005 Kawasaki mayoral election
 2005 Kiso mayoral election
 2005 Kobe mayoral election
 2005 Miyagi gubernatorial election
 2005 Nagaokakyō city assembly election
 2005 Saitama mayoral election
 2005 Tokyo prefectural election
 2005 Yuzawa mayoral election

Malaysia
 2005 Pengkalan Pasir by-election

Philippines
 2005 Autonomous Region in Muslim Mindanao general election

Europe
 2005 Abkhazian presidential election
 2005 Albanian parliamentary election
 2005 Andorran parliamentary election
 2005 Bulgarian parliamentary election
 2005 Croatian presidential election
 2005 Danish local elections
 2005 Danish parliamentary election
 2005 Dutch European Constitution referendum
 2005 French European Constitution referendum
 2005 Greenlandic parliamentary election
 2005 Jersey general election
 2005 Liechtenstein parliamentary election
 2005 Luxembourgian European Constitution referendum
 2005 Luxembourgian communal election
 2005 Maltese local council elections
 2005 Nagorno-Karabakh parliamentary election
 2005 Northern Cyprus presidential election
 2005 Northern Cyprus parliamentary election
 2005 Norwegian Sami parliamentary election
 2005 Norwegian parliamentary election
 2005 Polish parliamentary election
 2005 Polish presidential election
 2005 Portuguese legislative election
 2005 Portuguese local election
 2005 Zagreb local elections

Austria
 2005 Burgenland state election
 2005 Styrian state election
 2005 Viennese state election

Germany
 2005 German federal election
 2005 North Rhine-Westphalia state election
 2005 Schleswig-Holstein state election

Italy
 2005 Abruzzo regional election
 2005 Apulian regional election
 2005 Basilicata regional election
 2005 Calabrian regional election
 2005 Campania regional election
 2005 Emilia–Romagna regional election
 2005 Italian regional elections
 2005 Lazio regional election
 2005 Ligurian regional election
 2005 Lombard regional election
 2005 Marche regional election
 2005 Piedmontese regional election
 2005 Tuscan regional election
 2005 Umbrian regional election
 2005 Venetian regional election

Moldova
 2005 Chişinău election
 2005 Moldovan parliamentary election
 2005 Moldovan presidential election
 2005 Transnistrian legislative election

Spain
 2005 Basque parliamentary election
 2005 Galician parliamentary election

United Kingdom
 2005 United Kingdom general election
 2005 Auchtertool and Burntisland East by-election
 2005 Cheadle by-election
 2005 Conservative Party leadership election
 2005 United Kingdom elections
 2005 Glasgow Cathcart by-election
 2005 Livingston by-election
 2005 United Kingdom local elections
 2005 Ulster Unionist Party leadership election

United Kingdom local
 2005 United Kingdom local elections
 2005 Northern Ireland local elections

English local
 2005 Hertfordshire Council election
 2005 Isle of Wight Council election
 2005 Kent Council election
 2005 Lancashire County Council election
 2005 Lincolnshire County Council election
 2005 North Tyneside mayoral election
 2005 Northamptonshire Council election
 2005 Shropshire County Council election
 2005 Suffolk County Council election
 2005 Warwickshire County Council election
 2005 West Sussex County Council election
 2005 Wiltshire Council election

Scottish local
 2005 Auchtertool and Burntisland East by-election

United Kingdom general
 List of MPs elected in the 2005 United Kingdom general election
 2005 United Kingdom general election
 2005 United Kingdom general election result in Cornwall
 2005 United Kingdom general election result in Essex
 2005 United Kingdom general election result in Glasgow
 2005 United Kingdom general election result in Greater Manchester
 2005 United Kingdom general election result in Surrey
 2005 United Kingdom general election result in West Yorkshire
 2005 United Kingdom general election result in Merseyside
 2005 United Kingdom general election results in Lancashire
 2005 United Kingdom general election results in Scotland
 2005 List of parties contesting the United Kingdom general election
 2005 Marginal constituencies in the United Kingdom general election
 List of United Kingdom Parliament constituencies 2005–2010
 2005 Pre–election day events of the United Kingdom general election
 2005 Constituency results of the United Kingdom general election
 2005 Results breakdown of the United Kingdom general election
 Vote-OK

New Zealand general
 2005 New Zealand election funding controversy
 List of electorates in the New Zealand general election, 2005, by party vote
 2005 New Zealand general election
 2005 Opinion polling for the New Zealand general election
 2005 Party lists in the New Zealand general election

North America
 2005 Honduran general election
 2005 Organization of American States Secretary General election

Canada
 2005 Alberta Alliance Party leadership election
 2005 British Columbia electoral reform referendum
 2005 British Columbia general election
 2005 British Columbia municipal elections
 2002 Bromont municipal election
 2005 Bromont municipal election
 2005 Montreal municipal election
 2005 New Brunswick New Democratic Party leadership election
 2005 Newfoundland and Labrador municipal elections
 2005 Parti Québécois leadership election
 2005 Prince Edward Island electoral reform referendum
 2005 Vancouver municipal election

Quebec municipal
 2005 Quebec municipal elections
 Quebec municipal elections, 2005, results in Abitibi-Témiscamingue
 Quebec municipal elections, 2005, results in Bas-Saint-Laurent
 Quebec municipal elections, 2005, results in Capitale-Nationale
 Quebec municipal elections, 2005, results in Centre-du-Québec
 Quebec municipal elections, 2005, results in Chaudière-Appalaches
 Quebec municipal elections, 2005, results in Côte-Nord
 Quebec municipal elections, 2005, results in Estrie
 Quebec municipal elections, 2005, results in Gaspésie-Îles-de-la-Madeleine

Caribbean
 2005 Anguillan general election
 2005 Aruban general election
 2005 Caymanian general election
 2005 Dominican general election
 2005 Saint Vincent and the Grenadines general election
 2005 Tobago House of Assembly election

Puerto Rican
 2005 Puerto Rican unicameralism referendum

Mexico
 2005 Mexican elections
 2005 Coahuila state election
 2005 Colima gubernatorial election
 2005 México state election

Puerto Rican
 2005 Puerto Rican unicameralism referendum

United States
 2005 United States elections
 2005 United States gubernatorial elections

United States House of Representatives
 2005 California's 5th congressional district special election
 2005 California's 48th congressional district special election
 2005 Ohio's 2nd congressional district special election

United States gubernatorial
 2005 New Jersey gubernatorial election
 2005 Northern Mariana Islands gubernatorial election
 2005 Virginia gubernatorial election
 2005 Pennsylvania state elections

United States mayoral
 2005 Charlotte mayoral election
 2005 Houston mayoral election
 2005 Jersey City mayoral election
 2005 Los Angeles mayoral election
 2005 Mobile, Alabama mayoral election
 2005 New York City mayoral election
 2005 Pittsburgh mayoral election
 2005 Raleigh mayoral election
 Hoboken election of 2005
 2005 Houston elections
 Juneau, Alaska, regular election, 2005

California
 November 2005 San Francisco general elections

Northern Mariana Islands
 2005 Northern Mariana Islands general election
 2005 Northern Mariana Islands gubernatorial election

Puerto Rican
 2005 Puerto Rican unicameralism referendum

Virginia
 Creigh Deeds attorney general campaign, 2005

Washington (U.S. state)
 Washington Initiative 912 (2005)

Oceania
 2005 Fijian municipal election
 2005 Micronesian parliamentary election
 2005 New Zealand general election
 2005 Niuas by-election
 2005 Niuean general election
 2005 Northern Mariana Islands gubernatorial election
 2005 Tongan general election
 2005 Tongatapu by-election

Australia
 2005 Chatsworth state by-election
 2005 Macquarie Fields state by-election
 2005 Maroubra state by-election
 2005 Marrickville state by-election
 2005 Northern Territory general election
 2005 Pittwater state by-election
 2005 Redcliffe state by-election
 2005 Western Australian retail trading hours referendum
 2005 Western Australian state election

New Zealand
 2005 New Zealand general election

New Zealand general
 2005 New Zealand election funding controversy
 List of electorates in the New Zealand general election, 2005, by party vote
 2005 New Zealand general election
 2005 Opinion polling for the New Zealand general election
 2005 Party lists in the New Zealand general election

Northern Mariana Islands
 2005 Northern Mariana Islands general election
 2005 Northern Mariana Islands gubernatorial election

South America
 2005 Argentine legislative election
 2005 Bolivian legislative election
 2005 Bolivian presidential election
 2005 Brazilian firearms and ammunition referendum
 2005 Chilean parliamentary election
 2005–2006 Chilean presidential election
 2005 Falkland Islands general election
 2005 Organization of American States Secretary General election
 2005 Surinamese legislative election
 2005 Uruguayan municipal elections
 2005 Venezuelan parliamentary election

See also

 
2005
Elections